Ratibad is a village in the Bhopal district of Madhya Pradesh, India. It is located in the Huzur tehsil and the Phanda block. Radharaman Institute Of Technology & Science, Patel College of Science & Technology and Sagar Institute of Science and Technology campuses are located here.

Demographics 

According to the 2011 census of India, Ratibad has 327 households. The effective literacy rate (i.e. the literacy rate of population excluding children aged 6 and below) is 81.32%.

References 

Villages in Huzur tehsil